Geissomeria dawsonii is a plant native to the Cerrado vegetation of Brazil.

External links
 Flora vascular do bioma Cerrado

dawsonii
Flora of Brazil
Flora of the Cerrado